Junior Witter (born 10 March 1974) is a British former world champion professional boxer who competed from 1997 to 2015. He held the WBC light welterweight world title from 2006 to 2008 and challenged once for the IBF light welterweight title in 2000. At regional level, he held the British and Commonwealth light welterweight title from 2002 to 2005; the EBU European Union light welterweight title in 2003; and the EBU European light welterweight title from 2004 to 2005; and the British welterweight title in 2012.

Professional career

Early professional years
Witter's first fight as a professional took place in January 1997 and scored a draw over Cameron Raeside at the Green Bank Leisure Centre in Derbyshire.  He scored his first win as a professional in his next fight, travelling to Yarm to beat John Green over six rounds.  Five more fights happened in 1997 (all wins) for Witter to end the year with a record of 6-0-1.  Witter's next year as a professional started in the same way as his first; a draw over Mark Grundy!  Despite this he fought four more times during the year meaning that at the end of only his second year as a pro he had compiled of record of 12-0-2 scoring decent wins along the way over the likes of Jan Piet Bergman (35-1) and Mark Winters (13-1).  The beginning of 1999 begun with a two-round win over Malcolm Melvin.

IBF light-welterweight title challenge
Witter gained four more victories, then in June 2000, with a record of 15-0-2, he was given a late-notice shot at a world title against American Zab Judah.  The fight, which took place in Glasgow in Scotland on the undercard of Mike Tyson's fight with Lou Savarese, ended with first career defeat for the Englishman.  Witter lasted the distance but lost on points to the champion.  Speaking of the fight later on in his career and when he himself had finally won a World title, Witter said "It was a shot in the dark. During my first few years as a pro, I was struggling like mad financially, so when the shot came about it meant a really big payday. I thought: if I don't take it, I've got nothing - all my savings were gone and all my loans were on top of me. As far as the fight went, I didn't have enough experience. I wasn't even British champion and I had nine days to prepare for a shot at Judah, one of the best fighters in the world. I lost on points, but I learned so much. It taught me that I deserved to be at that level."

British, Commonwealth and European champion
Witter's response to his first defeat was to go the traditional route towards another crack at a World belt. Witter fought six more times since the Judah defeat beating the likes of Steve Conway (TKO 4) and Colin Mayisela (TKO 2) before, in March 2002, meeting Alan Bosworth for the vacant British light welterweight title claiming the belt with a stoppage in the third round. Witter's next fight saw him pick up the vacant Commonwealth title with a win over Ghanain Laatekwei Hammond. Two more fights in 2002 saw him beat Lucky Sambo in a non-title fight and Italian Giuseppe Lauri in an eliminator for the WBO light welterweight title.

Only two fights in 2003 saw the double champion add to his collection when in April 2003 he beat Belgian Jurgen Haeck for the European Union title. A first defence of his Commonwealth title took place in September at the MEN Arena in Manchester with a win in the 2nd round giving victory over Kenyan Fred Kinuthia. Witter finally challenged for the full European title in June 2004 beating Italian Salvatore Battaglia at the Ice Arena in Nottingham. The year ended for Witter with a first defence of his European crown at the Conference Center in Wembley beating Polish fighter Krzyztof Bienias.

Route to a second world title challenge
In February 2005, Witter travelled to Los Angeles for a WBC Light Welterweight eliminator against Australian-based Lovemore N'dou. The fight which also doubled as a further defence of his Commonwealth title ended with a 12-round points decision win for the man from Bradford. In July of the same year Witter returned to the Ice Arena in Nottingham to score a win over Ukrainian Andriy Kotelnik in a close fought fight which was also a defence of his European title. Witter finished the year with a win over fellow Brit Colin Lynes in a fight which saw his British, Commonwealth and European titles all on the line at the same time. The fight, this time at the York Hall in London, ended with another points victory over 12 rounds for Witter.

WBC light-welterweight champion
September 2006 finally saw Witter win a world title when he challenged American Demarcus Corley for the vacant WBC light welterweight belt at the Alexandra Palace in Wood Green. Eighteen fights and eighteen wins since losing to Zab Judah in 2000 Witter had finally achieved the pinnacle of his career so far. Two defences of the title followed in 2007 with wins over Mexican Arturo Morua (TKO 9) and Guyanese Vivian Harris (KO 7) before on 10 May 2008, losing the belt to mandatory challenger Timothy Bradley via split decision. Following his loss to Bradley, Witter declared he would continue fighting at a professional level and vowed to return to the ring to reclaim his WBC crown. Bradley commented that he would be happy to offer Witter a rematch if the money was right.

Comeback
Following the Bradley defeat Witter returned to the ring on 8 November 2008 and scored a third-round knockout of Argentinian Victor Hugo Castro. He knocked his opponent down in the second but was unable to finish it due to the bell instead finishing the fight early in the following round. Witter was then given the chance to fight for his old WBC title when in May 2009, Timothy Bradley was stripped of the belt for choosing not to fight his mandatory challenger Devon Alexander. This handed Witter an opportunity to fight Alexander for the now vacant belt. The contest took place in California on 1 August 2009 with Alexander proving too strong for the former champion with Witter, claiming an elbow injury in round four, having to retire at the end of round eight. The injury meant that Witter did not fight again til 19 February 2011, a year and a half since the loss to Alexander. The fight, this time in Ontario, Canada, resulted in another loss for Witter as he was beaten over 10 rounds by Romanian boxer Victor Puiu for the WBC International silver welterweight title. On 7 June 2011, Witter entered the welterweight version of the Prizefighter tournament at the York Hall in London and defeated Nathan Graham and Kevin McIntyre on the way to the final. In the final, Witter lost a majority points decision to Moroccan born fighter Yassine El maachi.

On 16 November 2013, Witter faced Albanian upcoming boxer Timo Schwarzkopf. He lost by majority decision.

Personal life
Witter trained at the Bradford Police Boys amateur boxing club, as an amateur boxer he represented England and captained a England school's team.

Early life

Witter studied at Carlton Bolling College, a high school located in Bradford, West Yorkshire.
Witter is Bradford's first World Boxing Champion.

Professional boxing record

References

External links

Junior Witter article at Sky Sports

1974 births
English male boxers
English people of Jamaican descent
Light-welterweight boxers
Living people
Sportspeople from Bradford
World Boxing Council champions
Prizefighter contestants
European Boxing Union champions
Commonwealth Boxing Council champions
Welterweight boxers
British Boxing Board of Control champions